= Beasley Creek =

Stream in California, U.S.

Coordinates: 38°56′39″N 123°19′24″W

Beasley Creek is a stream in the U.S. state of California. It is located in Mendocino County.
